Statistics of Primera Fuerza in season 1936-37.

Overview
It was contested by 5 teams, and Necaxa won the championship.

League standings

Moves
Marte joined for the 1937-38 season.

Top goalscorers
Players sorted first by goals scored, then by last name.

References
Mexico - List of final tables (RSSSF)

1936-37
Mex
1936–37 in Mexican football